The Franz Horr Stadium, formally known as Generali Arena for sponsorship reasons and Viola Park for international matches, is a football stadium in the south of Vienna, Austria.

It has been the home ground of FK Austria Wien since 1973. The stadium was built in 1925 as the new home of Czech immigrants' club SK Slovan and had a capacity of 10,850. Named after another Czech football club which owned the ground, the stadium was called České srdce ("Czech heart") ground. Largely destroyed during World War II, each of the four stands has been reconstructed several times since. The stadium was renamed Franz-Horr-Stadion in honour of the Wiener Fußball-Verband's (Vienna Football Association) president Franz Horr, who died in 1974.

In 2008 and between 2016 and 2018 the East, West and North stands were completely reconstructed as two-tier stands. The North stand also includes a new Top-VIP area. After these modifications, the stadium's maximum capacity is now 17,600.

In January 2011, the stadium was renamed Generali Arena, as part of a sponsorship deal between FK Austria Wien and the insurance group Generali. Since UEFA does not recognize sponsored stadium names, the venue is referred to as Viola Park in European competitions, after previously called the Austria Arena. It was originally planned to host the 2020 UEFA Women's Champions League Final, but that match was moved to Anoeta Stadium in San Sebastián due to adjustments caused by COVID-19 pandemic in Europe.

References

FK Austria Wien
Football venues in Austria
Czechs in Vienna
Sports venues in Vienna
Buildings and structures in Favoriten
Sports venues completed in 1925
1925 establishments in Austria
European League of Football venues
Vienna Vikings
20th-century architecture in Austria